"Tender" is a song by English rock band Blur from their sixth studio album, 13 (1999). Written by the four band members about Blur frontman Damon Albarn's breakup with musician turned painter Justine Frischmann, the song became Blur's eleventh top-10 hit on the UK Singles Chart, debuting and peaking at number two on 28 February 1999. It also reached the top 20 in Greece, Iceland, Ireland, Italy, New Zealand, Norway, and Spain.

Background, lyric and live performances
The song's lyric, by Damon Albarn and Graham Coxon, describes the break-up between Albarn and Justine Frischmann, then the lead singer of Britpop band Elastica. Frischmann told British newspaper The Observer that she cried the first time she heard the song, then felt embarrassed and angered before she calmed down. The writers share the singing, with backing vocals by the London Community Gospel Choir.

During Coxon's hiatus from the group, Blur continued to perform the song, with Albarn asking audiences to sing Coxon's lines, "Oh my baby/Oh my baby/Oh why?/Oh my". At Blur's headline appearance at the Reading Festival in 2003, he introduced the song by saying: "I don't want, for one moment, to be a sentimental but… Graham wrote this song as well… You know the bits he sings and I want you to sing them as loudly as you possibly can. Everyone needs to sing this song." Drummer Dave Rowntree would also sing Coxon's lines on occasion. In July 2009, when Blur re-formed, Coxon's lines in were repeated powerfully by the audience to call Blur back to the stage at Glastonbury, Hyde Park and T in the Park.

In March 2013, Albarn, Coxon, Paul Weller and Noel Gallagher performed the song at the Teenage Cancer Trust charity event.

Release and reception
It is the first track on Blur's sixth album 13 and was also released as the lead single before the album's release. The single reached number two on the UK Singles Chart – kept off number one by Britney Spears' "...Baby One More Time". The single had first-week sales of 176,000 and had an initial lead over Spears in the early part of the week, though "...Baby One More Time" would sell an additional 55,000 units over "Tender" to maintain the number one position. The song's release date had been brought forward to challenge a concern over Japanese imports.

The song was awarded "Single of the Fortnight" in Smash Hits, writing: "At seven-and-three-quarter minutes, Tender is at least two too long, but it's still the best skiffle-folk hymn of the year so far!" Chuck Taylor of Billboard called it a "huge departure" for the band and a "stellar piece of work," whose sound is reminiscent of the late-'60s and early-'70s. He wrote: "it's simply a polished, well-produced tip of the hat to a time when British pop stars could sing... and play tinny guitar solos without irony. Sarah Davis of Dotmusic called it a "breath of fresh air" and a "beautiful hymn of consolation," while noting its similarity to "Give Peace a Chance" by John Lennon. "Tender" was nominated in the category of Best British Single at the 2000 BRIT Awards. However, the award was won by Robbie Williams for "She's the One".

Video, B-side and remix
The video for the song is a live studio performance, filmed in black-and-white, featuring the band and a group of backing singers. Like Blur's earlier video for "End of a Century", it does not use the studio version's audio track. An official video for this track was recorded by Sophie Muller (director of the promo videos for "Beetlebum" and "Song 2"), but it was never released as the band simply did not like it. Initially, the track "Swamp Song" was slated to appear as one of the single's B-sides, but was promoted to the parent album 13. The appearance of "Song 2" on the single was a last-minute substitution. A remix of the song by Cornelius was released on the "No Distance Left to Run" single.

Track listings

UK CD1
 "Tender"
 "All We Want"
 "Mellow Jam"

UK CD2
 "Tender"
 "French Song"
 "Song 2"
 "Song 2" (video)

UK cassette and limited-edition 7-inch single
A. "Tender" – 7:41
B. "All We Want" – 4:33

Australian CD single
 "Tender"
 "All We Want"
 "Mellow Jam"
 "Song 2" (video)

Japanese CD single
 "Tender"
 "Swamp Song"
 "Mellow Jam"
 "French Song"

Production credits
 "Tender", "Mellow Jam", "French Song" and "Swamp Song" produced by William Orbit
 "All We Want" and "Song 2" produced by Stephen Street
 Damon Albarn – lead vocals, acoustic guitar
 Graham Coxon – electric guitar, co-lead vocals
 Alex James – bass, backing vocals
 Dave Rowntree – drums, backing vocals
 Additional backing vocals by the London Community Gospel Choir

Charts

Weekly charts

Year-end charts

Certifications

In popular culture
The song is featured during the ending credits of the movie Southland Tales (2007) by Richard Kelly.

In December 2017, a cover version of the song featured in a Christmas advert for Co-op.

The song is featured in the 2018 Showtime Limited miniseries drama, Patrick Melrose, in the end credits of the fifth and final episode.

The song appears in season 3, episode 3 of the Netflix series Sex Education.

In 2022, the song is featured in Aftersun, a drama film directed by Charlotte Wells.

References

 

1990s ballads
1998 songs
1999 singles
Blur (band) songs
EMI Records singles
Food Records singles
Music videos directed by Sophie Muller
Rock ballads
Songs written by Alex James (musician)
Songs written by Damon Albarn
Songs written by Dave Rowntree
Songs written by Graham Coxon